Bentsen is a Danish surname, and it means 'son of Bendt' which is a Danish nickname for Benedict. Notable people with the surname include:

Beint Bentsen (1917–2003), Norwegian banker and politician for the Christian Democratic Party
Christen Bentsen Schaaning (1616–1679), priest at Avaldsnes in Norway from 1635 to 1679
Erling Bentsen (1897–1962), Norwegian newspaper editor and politician for the Labour and Communist parties
Ivar Bentsen (1876–1943), Danish architect
Lloyd Bentsen (1921–2006), four-term United States senator (1971–1993) from Texas and 1988 Vice Presidential nominee
William Bentsen (born 1930), American sailor and Olympic champion

See also
Bentzen
Bendiksen
Benteng (disambiguation)
Bentes